William Sohmer (May 26, 1852 in Dunningen, Kingdom of Württemberg – February 2, 1929 in Brooklyn, New York City) was an American politician.

Life
He came with his parents in 1858 to New York City where his elder brother Hugo founded Sohmer & Co. in 1872. His father was a physician and cared about a good education for his sons. In 1872, he entered the insurance business, and finally became President of the Niagara Fire Insurance Company.

He was a member of the New York State Assembly (New York Co., 10th D.) in 1890, 1891 and 1892. Afterwards he was appointed a Deputy Tax Commissioner. In 1894, he was defeated when running for Sheriff of New York County. In 1895, he was elected Register of New York County, and in 1897 Clerk of New York County.

He was again a member of the State Assembly (New York Co., 10th D.) in 1904; and a member of the New York State Senate (12th D.) in 1907 and 1908.

He was New York State Comptroller from 1911 to 1914, elected at the New York state election, 1910 on the Democratic ticket; re-elected at the New York state election, 1912 on the Democratic and Independence League tickets; and defeated at the New York state election, 1914 for re-election running on both tickets again.

He was a delegate to the 1912 Democratic National Convention.

He was Treasurer of the Society of St. Tammany from 1910 on.

Sources
 Georg von Skal: History of German immigration in the United States and successful German-Americans and their descendants. New York, Smiley, 1908, p. 127, 164
 The campaign expenses, in NYT on November 11, 1894
 The Tammany nominees, in NYT on October 11, 1895
 The campaign expenses, in NYT on November 10, 1897
 The Democratic candidates, in NYT on October 1, 1910
 The Democratic candidates, in NYT on October 4, 1912
 Death notice in TIME Magazine on March 4, 1929

1852 births
1929 deaths
New York State Comptrollers
Politicians from New York City
Democratic Party members of the New York State Assembly
German emigrants to the United States
Democratic Party New York (state) state senators
United States Independence Party politicians